Blood Cancer UK, (formerly Bloodwise, Leukaemia & Lymphoma Research and the Leukaemia Research Fund) is a UK-based charity dedicated to funding research into all blood cancers including leukaemia, lymphoma and myeloma, as well as offering information and support to blood cancer patients.

Blood Cancer UK's vision is to beat blood cancer. They invest money into blood cancer research to ensure that all patients have their disease diagnosed early and accurately, receive personal, targeted treatments which are effective and have minimal side effects in order to beat or manage their cancer.

History
Blood Cancer UK was originally set up in 1960 as the Leukaemia Research Fund. The charity was started by the Eastwood family from Middlesbrough who began raising money following the death of their 6-year-old daughter Susan.

Since its foundation in 1960, Blood Cancer UK has invested over £500 million in a number of different research projects which have helped improve understanding, diagnosis and treatment of blood cancers.

In 1960 children diagnosed with leukaemia had a very poor chance of survival and Susan's parents were determined to make something positive come from their personal tragedy, so they started fundraising for research that would find a cure for leukaemia. Since then the charity has expanded to include over 150 branches. The research funded by the charity has enabled more people than ever before to survive blood cancer.  The survival rate for the most common form of childhood leukaemia has increased to over 90%, and for adults the survival rate is now as high as 70-80% for some forms of blood cancer.

In 2011 the charity launched a Trials Acceleration Programme (TAP) to enable quicker and greater access to new treatments which has subsequently received government recognition as a model of good practice. This programme aims to make the process of clinical trials quicker and easier within the UK. TAP links 13 treatment centres coordinated by a central hub in Birmingham to set up more clinical trials in blood cancer. Because of this geographical spread, it means 20 million people in the UK could have access to the very latest promising blood cancer treatments, if they needed it. Until 2015, 16 new clinical trials have either been opened or approved thanks to TAP.

A genetic study by a group of Newcastle University scientists published in the Journal of Clinical Oncology found that another research project funded by Bloodwise had reduced chances of a rare subtype of childhood leukaemia returning by 75%.

In the financial year 2015, the charity has been able to invest £32.3 million in gross new grant commitments, one of the biggest commitments they've ever made (FY14: £23.2 million). A full list of the charity's current research projects can be found on the National Cancer Research Institute’s International Cancer Research Portfolio.

In 2010 the charity renamed itself Leukaemia and Lymphoma Research, and in 2015 it became Bloodwise. 
In November 2019 the charity announced they were changing their name to Blood Cancer UK because the name Bloodwise was "confusing to the public and beneficiaries and was unpopular among staff."

Activities
The charity receives no government funding and is entirely dependent on voluntary donations from fundraising events or individuals in order to fund its research.

Fundraising Events: The charity holds a number of fundraising events throughout the year including several shows at the Royal Albert Hall and sports events such as The London Bikeathon, which is the largest independently organised bikeathon in the capital.

Sports Events: Supporters of the charity take part in a number of sporting events throughout the year. The events include running, cycling, swimming, triathlons and challenges. Their bright colourful t-shirts can often be seen at events up and down the country, as many supporters take part throughout the year as part of the charity's unstoppable sports team.

Information and support services 
Blood Cancer UK also writes and publishes patient information on a wide range of subjects including blood cancers and related disorders, treatment options and lifestyle issues, and booklets specifically designed for children with blood cancers.

Blood Cancer UK provides information for children, parents and many other people affected by blood cancers as well as detailed information on the various types of leukaemia, lymphoma and myeloma.

Specific sub-sets of leukaemia included are;
 Acute lymphoblastic leukaemia
 Acute myeloid leukaemia
 Acute promyelocytic leukaemia

 Chronic lymphocytic leukaemia

 Chronic myeloid leukaemia
 Diffuse large B-cell lymphoma (DLBCL) and other High grade non-Hodgkin lymphomas
 Hodgkin lymphoma
 Low-grade non-Hodgkin lymphoma
 Myelodysplastic syndromes (MDS)

Celebrity supporters
The charity has a number of celebrity supporters, including Alastair Campbell who is currently their Chairman of Fundraising; their patron the Duke of Kent; Sir Ian Botham who is the president of the charity; a significant number of the Emmerdale cast, a popular British soap opera in the 1970s and 1980s; George Rainsford, actor on British medical drama Casualty; Dolly Alderton and Pandora Sykes, co-hosts of The High Low podcast; Sam Heughan, star actor of Scottish time-travel drama Outlander, and the Calendar Girls who have raised over £3 million with their story since 1999.

The inspirational story of the Calendar Girls was transformed into a new musical written by Gary Barlow and Tim Firth, The Girls musical, a show that Bloodwise should benefit from. The musical ran from 14 November 2015  at the Leeds Grand Theatre, playing until Saturday 12 December 2015, before moving to Salford's Lowry Theatre from Friday 8 to Saturday 30 January 2016.

See also 
 Cancer in the United Kingdom

References

External links
 
 
 

Cancer organisations based in the United Kingdom
Health charities in the United Kingdom
Health in the London Borough of Camden
1960 establishments in the United Kingdom
Organisations based in the London Borough of Camden
Organizations established in 1960